Tilakuh or Tilkuh may refer to:
 Tilakuh, Dehgolan
 Tilkuh, Kamyaran
 Tilkuh, Saqqez
 Tilakuh Rural District, in Saqqez County